Fight Songs is an EP by The For Carnation, released on April 6, 1995 by Matador Records.

Track listing

Personnel 
Adapted from the Fight Songs liner notes.

The For Carnation
 John Herndon – drums
 Doug McCombs – bass guitar
 Brian McMahan – vocals, guitar, programming
 David Pajo – guitar

Production and additional personnel
 Grant Barger – engineering
 Andrew Bonacci – arrangement
 Greg Calbi – mastering
 Elizabeth Kelly – painting
 London Symphony Orchestra – strings

Release history

References

External links 
 Fight Songs at Discogs (list of releases)

1995 EPs
The For Carnation albums
Matador Records EPs